Dutch Squash Federation ("Squash Bond Nederland" in Dutch) is the National Organisation for Squash in the Netherlands.

External links
 Official site

See also
 Netherlands men's national squash team
 Netherlands women's national squash team

1938 establishments in the Netherlands
Squash in the Netherlands
National members of the World Squash Federation
Sports governing bodies in the Netherlands